Starbound is an action-adventure video game developed and published by Chucklefish. Starbound takes place in a two-dimensional, procedurally generated universe which the player is able to explore in order to obtain new weapons, armor, and items, and to visit towns and villages inhabited by various intelligent lifeforms. Starbound was released out of early access in July 2016 for Windows, OS X, and Linux, and for Windows via Xbox Game Pass in December 2020.

Synopsis 
Starbound begins with the player inside a spacecraft after the destruction of Earth, home of an intergalactic peacekeeping organization known as the Terrene Protectorate, while just having graduated from its ranks. With nothing to guide it, the shuttle shoots into space without direction, becoming lost in a sea of stars. The space shuttle orbits a habitable planet and an adventure begins that takes the player hurtling across the universe. Starbound contains both quests and story driven missions, buried inside its vast sandbox universe. The space shuttle acts as the player's vehicle while exploring the galaxy, containing a teleport pad the player can use to teleport down to the planets the shuttle is visiting, a ship locker for storing items, a fuel panel for refueling the ship and a cockpit for piloting the ship. The interior of the ship is also fully customizable, with items and blocks able to be freely placed within the ship.

Gameplay 

Many gameplay elements and features, such as items, enemies, and planets, use procedural generation in order to provide a variety of content. The game features story-based missions, quests, free world exploration, enemies to fight, and the ability to interact with and terraform the environment. Player class is defined by items that the player is wearing.

The player also has the ability to farm and sell crops, build buildings, and charge rent to tenant NPCs who can live in those buildings.

Development 
Starbound was announced by Chucklefish director Finn Brice in February 2012, with a tiered, Kickstarter-style, pre-order opening via the Humble Store on 13 April 2013. Tier options included a copy of the game, an invite to the beta, and a download of the game's soundtrack, as well as game-related "rewards", such as naming an in-game non-player character, designing a hat or weapon, and having a statue of oneself designed to be placed in the game. Within 24 hours of the pre-order opening, over 10,000 people backed the game, contributing over $230,000 to fund the game's development.

By May 2013, the Starbound pre-order had reached all three of its stretch goals by raising over $1,000,000. The game entered an early access beta on Steam on 4 December 2013, receiving over $2,000,000 in pre-orders prior to its launch. Starbound is written in C++ and uses a custom game engine. The soundtrack was composed by American composer Curtis Schweitzer. The game was officially released out of early access on 22 July 2016. The game will also be ported for the Xbox One at a later time.

Volunteer exploitation controversy 
In 2019, Chucklefish were accused of exploiting around a dozen voluntary contributors during Starbound'''s development, sometimes logging hundreds of hours with no compensation and completing the same tasks as paid members of the team. Many of them were teenagers at the time and stated that they felt their inexperience was exploited by the company's director, Finn Brice. The allegations were supported by former members of the team, including notable game developer Toby Fox. In a statement, Chucklefish said that contributors were under no obligation to create content or put in any particular number of hours, but did not deny the veracity of the claims.

 Reception Starbound received favourable reviews upon its release, according to video game review aggregator Metacritic. IGN praised Starbound crafting, exploration, and combat mechanics, comparing it to Terraria. Christopher Livingston of PC Gamer stated that Starbound was a charming space sandbox that would keep players entertained for hours. Nathan Grayson of Kotaku praised its exploration elements, calling the universe "strange and unpredictable" enough that players would never quite grow tired of it.

By December 2016, Starbound'' had sold over 2.5 million copies.

Awards

References

External links 
 
 Official wiki

2016 video games
Chucklefish games
Early access video games
Indie video games
Linux games
Lua (programming language)-scripted video games
MacOS games
Multiplayer and single-player video games
Open-world video games
PlayStation 4 games
PlayStation Vita games
Science fiction video games
Video games developed in the United Kingdom
Video games featuring protagonists of selectable gender
Video games set on fictional planets
Video games using procedural generation
Video games with Steam Workshop support
Windows games
Xbox One games